Julia Bridget Lynch (1896–1975) was a New Zealand portrait artist. In 1924 she joined the order of the Sisters of Mercy in Wellington and became Sister Mary Lawrence.

Biography 
Lynch was born in Manawatu province. She studied art in Palmerston North and then at Slade School of Fine Art in London from 1921 to 1923. While there she was awarded a gold medal in portraiture, the first New Zealander to receive such an award.  In 1924 she returned to New Zealand and joined the order of the Sisters of Mercy in Wellington. She became Sister Mary Lawrence and spent the remainder of her career teaching art at St Mary's College.

In 1975 Lynch's portrait Polish Dancer won the Kelliher Art Prize.

Lynch painted a number of prominent New Zealanders' portraits, including Jean Batten, Norman Kirk and Sir Arthur Porritt.

References 

1896 births
1975 deaths
People from Manawatū-Whanganui
20th-century New Zealand artists
Alumni of the Slade School of Fine Art
Portrait artists